Slow Dancing with the Moon is the thirty-second solo studio album by American entertainer Dolly Parton. It was released on February 23, 1993. The album features a number of famous guest artists, including Collin Raye, Mary Chapin Carpenter, Kathy Mattea, Tanya Tucker, Maura O'Connell, Billy Dean, Pam Tillis, Marty Stuart and Billy Ray Cyrus. The album released three singles, "Romeo" (top 30), "More Where That Came From" (which didn't make the top 40), and "Full Circle" (which didn't chart). Despite the singles' lackluster chart performance, however, the album itself was well-received critically, and reached number 4 on the U.S. country albums charts – where it spent 35 weeks – and number 16 on the pop albums charts. It ended up being certified Platinum by the Recording Industry Association of America.

 Composed mostly of Parton's own songs, the album also contained a cover of Jackie DeShannon's "Put a Little Love in Your Heart".

The song "More Where That Came From" appeared in a 1993 episode of Beavis and Butt-Head and was used in a 2008 commercial for Target.

The song "What Will Baby Be" was a re-recorded version of her 1973 song however the original version was not released until her Dolly box set album in 2009.

In 2009, Sony Music reissued Slow Dancing with the Moon in a triple-feature CD set with Eagle When She Flies and White Limozeen.

Track listing

Chart performance
Album

Album (year-end)

References

External links
Slow Dancing With The Moon at dollyon-line.com

1993 albums
Dolly Parton albums
Columbia Records albums
Albums produced by Steve Buckingham (record producer)